Nationality words link to articles with information on the nation's poetry or literature (for instance, Irish or France).

Events

Works published

Great Britain
 Geoffrey Chaucer, posthumously published:
 The Canterbury Tales, the Pynson edition (see Canturbyry Tales 1477)
 The House of Fame, publication year uncertain, Pynson edition (see also The House of Fame 1483)
 Troilus and Criseyde, publication year uncertain, published anonymously, Pynson edition (see also Troilus and Criseyde 1483)

Italy
 Giorgio Anselmo, six books of epigrams, octavo volumes, Parma; in Latin
 Teofilo Folengo, writing under the pen name "Limerno Pitocco (Merlin the Beggar) da Mantova", Orlandino, a poem of eight cantos, written in rhymed octaves
 Jacopo Sannazaro:
 De Partu Virginis ("The Virgin's Childbirth"), epic, religious poem
 Piscatoria ("Piscatorial Eclogues"), five books are extant and a fragmentary version of a sixth book

Other
 Shin Maha Rahtathara, Kogan Pyo, Burma

Births
Death years link to the corresponding "[year] in poetry" article:
 Mahmud Abdülbâkî (محمود عبد الباقى), known by his pen name "Bâḳî" (باقى), Ottoman Turk (died 1600)
 Tani Soyo 谷宗養 (died 1563), Japanese renga poet; a rival of Satomura Joha; son of Tani Sobuko

Deaths
Birth years link to the corresponding "[year] in poetry" article:
 Jean Marot died about this year (born c. 1450), French poet and father of poet Clément Marot

See also

 Poetry
 16th century in poetry
 16th century in literature
 French Renaissance literature
 Renaissance literature
 Spanish Renaissance literature

Notes

16th-century poetry
Poetry